Portsville is an unincorporated community in Sussex County, Delaware, United States. The Portsville Lighthouse, which is listed on the National Register of Historic Places, is located in Portsville.

There is an 8.6 acre pond nearby called Tussock Pond.

References

Unincorporated communities in Sussex County, Delaware
Unincorporated communities in Delaware